Kenneth Carmichael Fyfe (14 April 1914 – 29 January 1974) was a Scottish rugby union player. He was born in Karachi (now Pakistan) and died in Johannesburg, South Africa. His mother was English and his father was the Scottish international association football player John Fyfe, with his heritage making him eligible for the Scotland national rugby union team – he gained nine caps between 1933 and 1939 including two Calcutta Cup wins over England at Murrayfield, and scored the winning try in the 1933 fixture. He attended the University of Cambridge and counted Sale among his club sides.

References

1914 births
1974 deaths
Rugby union wings
Alumni of the University of Cambridge 
Sale Sharks players 
Anglo-Scots 
Scottish rugby union players
Scotland international rugby union players
Scottish cricketers
Europeans cricketers
Sportspeople from Karachi